Igor Rocha may refer to:

 Igor Rocha (footballer, born 1984), Portuguese football defender
 Igor Rocha (footballer, born 1993), Portuguese football goalkeeper
 Igor Rocha (footballer, born 1995), Brazilian football forward